StarBargains.co.uk was a grocery retailer chain, which was based in Sheffield, South Yorkshire, and operated throughout Europe.

History
In March 2018, Frozen Value Ltd announced they were trading online as Star Bargains, taking over their Fulton's Foods retail trading name. The online offering excludes chilled & frozen.
In January 2022, it was announced that Star Bargains would close in February and would be replaced with Poundland's new home delivery service. People were still able to place orders  on starbargains.co.uk until 23 January 2022. The website closed on January 31, 2022 and was folded into the online operations of Poundland. The customer support team closed after 28 February.

References

External links
 Star Bargains website

Supermarkets of the United Kingdom
Retail companies of England
Companies based in South Yorkshire
British companies established in 1960
Retail companies established in 1960
1960 establishments in England